is a Japanese gymnast. She competed at the 1984 Summer Olympics and the 1988 Summer Olympics.

Eponymous skill
Morio has one eponymous skill listed in the Code of Points.

References

External links
 

1967 births
Living people
Japanese female artistic gymnasts
Olympic gymnasts of Japan
Gymnasts at the 1984 Summer Olympics
Gymnasts at the 1988 Summer Olympics
Place of birth missing (living people)
Asian Games medalists in gymnastics
Gymnasts at the 1982 Asian Games
Gymnasts at the 1986 Asian Games
Asian Games bronze medalists for Japan
Medalists at the 1982 Asian Games
Medalists at the 1986 Asian Games
Originators of elements in artistic gymnastics
20th-century Japanese women